Safa Khaneh (also Romanized as Şafā Khāneh) is a village in Safa Khaneh Rural District, in the Central District of Shahin Dezh County, West Azerbaijan Province, Iran. At the 2006 census, its population was 1,356, in 266 families.

References 

Populated places in Shahin Dezh County